École Secondaire Oak Bay High School is a high school in the Greater Victoria School District and is located in Oak Bay, British Columbia, Canada. The enrollment is approximately 1,400 students attending in grades 9 to 12 in both regular and French immersion programs.  The school moved into new facilities on the same site in 2015. The construction took roughly 2.5 years.

History and facilities
The first high school in Oak Bay was opened in 1915 where the Oak Bay Municipal Hall now stands. However this school quickly became over-crowded and replaced by what was the East Building at the school's present location on Cranmore Road in 1929. Oak Bay Junior High school was constructed on the west side of the school property opening in 1953. The two schools were amalgamated in the late 1970s and the buildings named "West" and "East". 

When the province renamed all its high schools 'Secondary School', Oak Bay High School,  Victoria High School, and Esquimalt High School were the only schools to retain 'High School' as part of their names.

In October, 2011 plans were announced to replace the existing school with a new $50 million facility to  accommodate up to 1,300 students, including 100 international students, as well as a Neighbourhood Learning Centre.  The existing 1957-era gymnasium will be converted into a performing arts theatre with support space for both school and community use.  Construction began in the summer of 2013.  The new building was completed for the start of the 2015-2016 school year.  The site work and removal of the old buildings is expected to be completed by 2016. By September 2015, the entire man building of the school had been finished construction, though the artificial turf soccer field, and the new rugby pitch, were under construction as late as 2020.

Athletics
Oak Bay has a large athletics program; its teams compete in basketball (Bays), rugby (Barbarians), cross country running, track and field, soccer, volleyball (Barbers), field hockey, badminton, tennis, cycling, sailing, skiing & snowboarding and cricket. Oak Bay's Track and Field team is widely regarded as the most successful high school track team in British Columbia. The team has won over 10 Provincial titles and is a perennial island and city champion.

Fine Arts
Oak Bay has a Fine Arts program, including choirs, bands, a string orchestra and multiple dance troupes. Oak Bay Secondary puts on an annual musical production, run and performed by the senior students. Oak Bay High School also hosts an arts program, including, from 1996–2006, the Oak Bay Community Theater.

Notable alumni
Pierre Berton, Author
Mark Chao, Actor and singer
Geoff Courtnall, NHL player
Russ Courtnall - NHL player 
Anna-Marie de Zwager, Olympic rower
Vicki Gabereau,  Canadian radio and television personality
Ken Kirzinger, Stuntman and actor
Phil Mack, Rugby player and coach
Iain McCaig, Illustrator and conceptual designer
Kiril Petkov, Prime Minister of Bulgaria
Jim Rutledge, Professional golfer
John Ruttan, Former Mayor of Nanaimo
Roger Stanier, Microbiologist 
Adam Straith, Soccer player
Simon Thomas, Soccer player
Deborah Kara Unger, Actress
Roy Henry Vickers, First Nations artist
Andrew Weaver, MLA and Green Party of British Columbia leader
Mark Wyatt, Rugby player

References

External links
 Oak Bay High School website

High schools in Victoria, British Columbia
French-language schools in British Columbia
Educational institutions established in 1915
1915 establishments in British Columbia